Papowo-Osieki  in Papowo Toruńskie village in the district of Gmina Łysomice, within Toruń County, Kuyavian-Pomeranian Voivodeship, in north-central Poland.

References

Papowo-Osieki